New Riders is an album by the country rock band the New Riders of the Purple Sage.  Their seventh studio album and their ninth album overall, it was recorded and released in 1976.

New Riders was the New Riders' first album on the MCA Records label, and their second to be produced by Bob Johnston.  It consists of nine cover songs, plus one new original tune by John Dawson.

Track listing
"Fifteen Days under the Hood" (Jack Tempchin) – 2:42
"Annie May" (Vick Thomas) – 3:26
"You Never Can Tell" (Chuck Berry) – 3:52
"Hard to Handle" (Otis Redding, Al Bell, Allen Jones) – 3:38
"Dead Flowers" (Mick Jagger, Keith Richards) – 3:56
"Don't Put Her Down" (Hazel Dickens) – 4:12
"Honky Tonkin' (I Guess I Done Me Some)" (Delbert McClinton) – 2:47
"She's Looking Better Every Beer" (John Shine) – 2:38
"Can't Get Over You" (John Dawson) – 2:03
"The Swimming Song" (Loudon Wainwright III) – 2:01

Personnel

New Riders of the Purple Sage
John Dawson – rhythm guitar, vocals
David Nelson – lead guitar, vocals
Buddy Cage – pedal steel guitar
Skip Battin – bass, vocals
Spencer Dryden – drums

Production
Bob Johnston – producer
Tom Flye – engineer
Eric Schilling – assistant engineer
Rod Dyer – album design
George Osaki – art direction

Notes

New Riders of the Purple Sage albums
1976 albums
Albums produced by Bob Johnston
MCA Records albums